Rolf Steffenburg (14 March 1886 – 18 March 1982) was a sailor from Sweden, who represented his native country at the 1920 Summer Olympics in Antwerp, Belgium. Steffenburg took the gold in the 30m² Skerry Cruiser.

References

Sources
 
 

Swedish male sailors (sport)
Sailors at the 1920 Summer Olympics – 30m2 Skerry cruiser
Olympic sailors of Sweden
1886 births
1982 deaths
Kullaviks Kanot- och Kappseglingsklubb sailors
Medalists at the 1920 Summer Olympics
Olympic gold medalists for Sweden
Olympic medalists in sailing
People from Gävle
Sportspeople from Gävleborg County